Tusanlui-ye Barzand (also Romanized as Tūsānlūī-ye Barzand; also known as Tūsanlū and Tūsānlū-ye Barzand) is a village in Pain Barzand Rural District, Anguti District, Germi County, Ardabil Province, Iran. At the 2006 census, its population was 253, in 48 families.

References 

Towns and villages in Germi County